Jahnula is a genus of aquatic fungi in the family Aliquandostipitaceae. The genus was first named by Wilhelm Kirschstein in 1936. 

The genus name of Jahnula is in honour of Eduard Adolf Wilhelm Jahn (1871-1942), German botanist (Mycology) and teacher in Berlin.

The genus was circumscribed by Wilhelm Kirschstein in Ann. Mycol. vol.34 on page 196 in 1936.

Species
There are about 15 species;
Jahnula apiospora
Jahnula appendiculata
Jahnula aquatica
Jahnula australiensis
Jahnula bipileata
Jahnula bipolaris
Jahnula granulosa
Jahnula morakotii
Jahnula poonythii
Jahnula potamophila
Jahnula purpurea
Jahnula rostrata
Jahnula sangamonensis
Jahnula seychellensis
Jahnula siamensis
Jahnula systyla

References

External links

Jahnulales
Dothideomycetes genera